Dominik Hofbauer (born 10 September 1990) is an Austrian footballer.

External links 
 
 
 
 

Living people
1990 births
Austrian footballers
Austrian Football Bundesliga players
Ekstraklasa players
SC Rheindorf Altach players
Arka Gdynia players
SKN St. Pölten players
Austrian expatriate footballers
Expatriate footballers in Poland
Austrian expatriate sportspeople in Poland
Association football midfielders
People from Eggenburg
Footballers from Lower Austria